Hermengild Li Yi (November 11, 1923 – May 24, 2012) was the Catholic bishop of the Diocese of Lu'an, China.

Ordained in 1949, Li Yi was ordained bishop clandestinely in 1998.

Notes

21st-century Roman Catholic bishops in China
1923 births
2012 deaths